In Greek mythology, Echemmon (Ancient Greek: Ἐχέμμων or Ἐχέμμον) may refer to the following characters:

 Echemmon, a Trojan hero and son of King Priam of Troy. He was killed together with his brother Chromius by Diomedes, king of Argos, during the Trojan War.
 Echemmon, a friend of Thoas who was killed by Eurypylus of Mysia during the siege of Troy.

Notes

References 

 Apollodorus, The Library with an English Translation by Sir James George Frazer, F.B.A., F.R.S. in 2 Volumes, Cambridge, MA, Harvard University Press; London, William Heinemann Ltd. 1921. ISBN 0-674-99135-4. Online version at the Perseus Digital Library. Greek text available from the same website.
Homer, The Iliad with an English Translation by A.T. Murray, Ph.D. in two volumes. Cambridge, MA., Harvard University Press; London, William Heinemann, Ltd. 1924. Online version at the Perseus Digital Library.
 Homer, Homeri Opera in five volumes. Oxford, Oxford University Press. 1920. Greek text available at the Perseus Digital Library.
 Quintus Smyrnaeus, The Fall of Troy translated by Way. A. S. Loeb Classical Library Volume 19. London: William Heinemann, 1913. Online version at theio.com
 Quintus Smyrnaeus, The Fall of Troy. Arthur S. Way. London: William Heinemann; New York: G.P. Putnam's Sons. 1913. Greek text available at the Perseus Digital Library.

Achaeans (Homer)
Trojans
Princes in Greek mythology
Children of Priam